Sourabh Majumdar (born 4 February 1999) is an Indian cricketer. He made his Twenty20 debut on 14 January 2021, for Chhattisgarh in the 2020–21 Syed Mushtaq Ali Trophy. He made his List A debut on 20 February 2021, for Chhattisgarh in the 2020–21 Vijay Hazare Trophy. He made his first-class debut on 17 February 2022, for Chhattisgarh in the 2021–22 Ranji Trophy.

References

External links
 

1999 births
Living people
Indian cricketers
Chhattisgarh cricketers
People from Jagdalpur